Anima Mundi (also known as The Soul of the World) is a 1991 Italian-American short documentary film directed by Godfrey Reggio. The film focuses on the world of nature and wildlife, particularly jungles, sealife, and insects.

Production
The movie was commissioned by Italian jewellers Bulgari for use by the World Wide Fund for Nature in their Biological Diversity Program.

Music
The film was scored by Philip Glass, who also worked with Reggio on Koyaanisqatsi (1983), Powaqqatsi (1988), and, later, on Naqoyqatsi (2002). Anima Mundi features many of the techniques from the Qatsi trilogy, but it is not considered to be directly related to the series.

Home media
The short was released on the Criterion Collection alongside the Qatsi trilogy on December 11, 2012.

References

External links
 
 Homepage
 Excerpt

1991 films
Documentary films about nature
1991 documentary films
Films scored by Philip Glass
World Wide Fund for Nature
Films directed by Godfrey Reggio
Non-narrative films
Italian short documentary films
American short documentary films
1991 short films
1990s short documentary films
1990s American films